"Bust It Baby" is a single by American rapper Plies released on January 25, 2008, and is the first single from Plies' second album, Definition of Real. The original was featured as a bonus track on Definition of Real, while "Bust It Baby Pt. 2", which features R&B singer Ne-Yo, is an official track on the album.

The song features a noticeable sample of Janet Jackson's 1990 single "Come Back to Me", a #2 hit from her 1989 album "Janet Jackson's Rhythm Nation 1814". Jackson is also featured on the song's official remix.

Bust It Baby Pt. 2
"Bust It Baby (Part 2)" is the second part of the two single release of "Bust It Baby", making it the first "double single." On the R&B/Hip Hop chart, "Bust It Baby (Part 2)" peaked at #2, surpassing the original. It is Plies' second top 10 hit on the Billboard Hot 100, and his biggest hit on the chart to date, peaking at #7. This surpassed the #9 peak of  "Shawty" in 2007, and tying for Slip-n-Slide Records' highest placement on the Hot 100 (the other SNS single to reach that peak was Trick Daddy's 2004 single "Let's Go" featuring Lil Jon and Twista). In New Zealand, the song jumped from #22 to #9 in its second week on the chart.

Music video
The music video directed by Plies himself debuted on BET's Rap City on April 28, 2008. DJ Khaled, Rick Ross, and Ace Hood make cameos. It debuted on 106 & Park on May 1, 2008. "Bust It Baby Pt. 2" has had multiple number ones on 106 & Park.  It stayed on the countdown for 35 days.

Charts

Weekly charts

Year-end charts

Certifications

Radio and release history

References

2008 singles
Ne-Yo songs
Plies (rapper) songs
Song recordings produced by J. R. Rotem
Songs written by Ne-Yo
Songs written by Plies (rapper)
Songs written by Jimmy Jam and Terry Lewis
Songs written by Janet Jackson
Songs written by J. R. Rotem
2008 songs
Atlantic Records singles